Oliver Twist is a 1912 silent feature film drama based on Charles Dickens' classic 1838 novel Oliver Twist. This film is the first feature version of the story followed by a later British film released in October 1912. Nat C. Goodwin, a distinguished comedian from the Broadway stage, stars. The General Film Company, usually a distributor, produced this film and it was released on State Rights basis.

A print survives in the Library of Congress collection.

Plot summary

Cast
 Nat C. Goodwin - Fagin
 Vinnie Burns - Oliver Twist
 Charles Rogers - Artful Dodger
 Mortimer Martine - Bill Sikes 
 Beatrice Moreland - Nancy
 Edwin McKim - Monks
 Daniel Read - Bates
 Hudson Liston - Mr. Brownlow
 Frank Kendrick - Mr. Grimwig
 Stuart Holmes - Bumble, the Beadle
 Lillian DeLesque - Rose
 Mrs. Liston - Mrs. Maylie
 Will Scherer - Giles
 Frank Stafford - Brittles
 Louise White - Agnes Fleming
 Jack Hopkins - Charles Leeford
 Agnes Stone - Nurse

See also
 Oliver Twist (1909)
 Oliver Twist (1912)
 Oliver Twist (1916)
 Oliver Twist (1919)
 Oliver Twist (1922)
 Oliver Twist (1933)

References

External links
  Oliver Twist at IMDb.com
 

1912 films
American silent feature films
Films based on Oliver Twist
American black-and-white films
Silent American drama films
1912 drama films
1910s American films